Batu Siharulidze (born 7 May 1960 in the Republic of Georgia) is a Georgian artist naturalised in the United States, most widely known for his abstract figurative sculptures. He now lives in Boston, Massachusetts where he is an Associate Professor of Art at Boston University.

Biography
Isidore "Batu" Siharulidze was born on May 7, 1960 in Kutaisi, Republic of Georgia.  Batu’s talent as a sculptor was recognized while he was in his early teens, and he was given entry into the Tbilisi College of Art at the age of fourteen.  One of his early bronze sculptures, “Boy on a Horse”, is now in the Norton and Nancy Dodge Collection of Soviet Nonconformist Art at the Zimmerli Art Museum at Rutgers University. Batu earned a graduate degree in sculpture from the Tbilisi State Academy of Fine Art and a post-graduate degree from the All-Union Academy in Moscow. After earning his post-graduate degree he taught at the Tbilisi State Academy of Arts until he came to the U.S. in 1994, having been granted the status of an “Artist of Exceptional Talent”. Batu became a U.S. citizen in 2002. He has continued his career as an artist and educator, teaching sculpture and drawing in several U.S. universities, including Virginia Commonwealth University, George Mason University, and Boston University.

Over the last decade Batu has exhibited and participated in the sculpture exhibits and symposiums in the U.S., Turkey, Italy, China, Spain, Great Britain, Austria, Netherlands, Russia, and Georgia. His works are held in museums, private collections, and in permanent outdoor displays in the United States, Great Britain, the Netherlands, Turkey, India, China, and Georgia.

Batu lives with his wife and two children in Boston, Massachusetts. Currently he is an Associate Professor of Art, Chairman of the Sculpture Department and Head of the Graduate Sculpture Program at Boston University. He teaches various sculpting classes, as well as figure drawing classes. He is a member of the Board of Directors of Contemporary Art International, Inc.

Competitions
 1991: Rustavi International Sculpture Competition, Rustavi, Georgia
 1997: Pier Walk '97, Chicago, Illinois, USA
 2002: International Stone Sculpture Competition, Mersin, Turkey
 2003: International Stone Sculpture Competition, Trakia University, Trakia (Border of Greece, Turkey, Bulgaria)
 2006: International Stone Sculpture Competition, Ankara University, Ankara, Turkey
 2008: IV International Termera (Asat) Stone Sculpture Competition, Bodrum, Turkey
 2008: Huseyin Gezer International Marble Carving Competition, Mersin, Turkey
 2009: Fifth China (Hui'an) Carving Art Festival, Hui'an, Jiangua, China
 2010: Second International Bronze Sculpture Competition, Vadodara, India
 2010: First International Copper Sculpture Competition, Tongling, Anhuik, China
 2011: First International Granite Carving Competition, Acton, Massachusetts, USA
 2012: Twelfth Sculpture Competition, "Ancient Enigma", Andres Institute of Art, Brookline, New Hampshire, United States
 2012: Fifth International Sculpture Competition, "Autumn Inspiration", Penza, Russia
 2012: Sculpture Competition, Akhalkalaki Municipality Architectural Project, Akhalkalaki, Georgia
 2013: 14th China Changchun (Nong'an) International Sculpture Competition, Changchun, China
 2014: Seventh International Sculpture Competition, "Autumn Inspiration", Penza, Russia
 2014: First International Sculpture Competition, Tormino, Spain
 2014: China-Fuzhou International Sculpture Competition, Fuzhou, China
 2015: Fifth International Bronze Sculpture Competition, Vadodara, India

Museums

Aegean Sea, Marble, Murat Balkan Outdoor Sculpture Museum, Bodrum, Turkey
Adam & Eve 2, Bronze, Murat Kalkan Art Collection, Ankara, Turkey
Adam & Eve in Repose, Plaster, B’nai B’rith Klutznick National Jewish Museum, Washington, DC, USA
Communist Freedom, Painted Plaster, Zimmerli Art Museum, Rutgers University, New Jersey
Boy on Horse, Bronze, Zimmerli Art Museum, Rutgers University, New Jersey
Portrait of Norton Dodge, Bronze, Zimmerli Art Museum, Rutgers University, New Jersey
Dying Warrior, Marble & Bronze, Modern Art Museum, Tbilisi, Georgia
Tied Man, Life-Size Painted Plaster, Fine Art Museum, Kutaisi, Georgia

Permanent displays
In The River, 8' x 9' x 3', Bronze, Uttaryan Foundation Sculpture Park, Vadodara, Gujarat, India
Galicia, 5.7' x 5.7' x 2.62', Granite, Public Space, Tormino, Spain
Day with Dragon, 7' x 9' x 2', Bronze, Sculpture Park, Penza, Russia
Playing in the Rice Fields, 8' x 5' x 2', Bronze, Nong'an People's Park, Changchun, China
Sunset, 6' x 8' x 3', Bronze, Sculpture Park, Penza, Russia
Conscious, 4' x 6' x 3', Granite, Andres Institute Sculpture Park, Brookline, New Hampshire, USA
Asleep, 7' x 4' x 3', Granite, Sculpture Garden, Acton, Massachusetts, USA
Kneeling Girl, 6 ' x 4' x 2', Copper, Tongling Sculpture Park, Tonglin, Anhui, China
Chinese Girl, 1 1/2' x 3' x 2', Wood, Jilin University, Changchun, China
On the Horizon, 6' x 8' x 3', Bronze, Uttaryan Foundation Sculpture Park, Vadodara, Gujarat, India
Adam & Eve, 8' x 4' 4', Bronze, Chanchun Sculpture Park, Shuagyang, Changcun, Jilnan, China
Hui'an Girl, 5 1/2' x 8' x 3', Green Granite, Public Space, Hui'an, Jiangsu, China
Tied Man, 6' x 7' x 3', White Marble, Public Space, Mercin, Turkey
Human Mind, 5' x 6' x 3', White Marble, Ankara University Sculpture Garden, Ankara, Turkey
Aegean Sea, 6' x 7' x 3', White Marble, Aspat Outdoor Sculpture Museum, Bodrum, Turkey
Trakia, 7' x 6' x 4', White Marble, Peace Garden, Border of Turkey, Bulgaria, and Greece
Table, 4' x 6' x 3', White Marble, Public Space, Mersin, Turkey
Embrace, 8' x 4' x 4', Bronze, Stoneleigh, Fairfax, Virginia
Tranquility, 7' z 4' x 5', Stone, Sculpture Garden, Rustavi, Georgia

References

Sculptors from Georgia (country)
Living people
Boston University alumni
1960 births
Artists from Boston
Tbilisi State Academy of Arts alumni
Academic staff of the Tbilisi State Academy of Arts